Panemangalore is a locality on the banks of the Netravati River near BC Road. It lies in Bantwal taluk of Dakshina Kannada district. The National Highway 75 passes through this region. It is located 27 km east of Mangalore city. It lies in between BC Road and Melkar and forms a continuous urban area with them. They are also developing as the eastern suburbs of Mangalore.

Cities and towns in Dakshina Kannada district